Give My Head Peace is a Northern Irish sitcom that has run for 15 series as of 2022

Episodes

Pilot (1995)

Series 1 (early 1998)

Series 2 (Late 1998)

Christmas Special  (1998)

Series 3 (1999)

Christmas Special (1999)

Series 4 (2000)

Christmas Special (2000)

Series 5 (early 2001)

Series 6 (Late 2001)

Series 7 (Early 2002)

Series 8 (Late 2002)

Series 9 (2003–2004)

Series 10 (2004–2005)

Special (2005–2016)

Series 11 (2018)

Christmas Special (2018)

2019 Christmas Special (2019)

Series 12 (2019–2020)

Series 13 (2020–2021)

Series 14 (2021–2022)

Series 15 (2022-2023)

Documentaries

References

Lists of British sitcom episodes